Simone Solinas (born 3 March 1996) is an Italian footballer who plays for Trieste as a forward.

Club career
Born in Sassari, Solinas began his career on Cagliari's youth categories, and was promoted to main squad for 2013–14 season, receiving the no. 39 jersey.

On 19 January 2014 Solinas made his professional debut, coming on as a late substitute in a 0–1 loss at Atalanta.

On 4 August 2015, he joined Unione Triestina.

References

External links
Cagliari official profile 

1996 births
Living people
Italian footballers
Association football forwards
Cagliari Calcio players
Serie A players